Wu Po-hsiung (born 19 June 1939) is a Taiwanese politician who is a former chairman of the Kuomintang (KMT). He has been the Interior Minister (1984-1988), Mayor of Taipei (1988–1990), Secretary-General to the President (1991–1996), and Chairman of the KMT (2007-2009). Wu was nominated as Honorary Chairman of the Kuomintang when he was succeeded by Ma Ying-jeou as the Chairman of the Kuomintang.

Early life
Born to a Hakka family in Zhongli, Taoyuan in 1939, Wu received a bachelor's degree in business administration from National Cheng Kung University in 1962.

Early political life
He entered politics when he was elected into the Taiwan Provincial Council in the Taoyuan County electoral district from 1968 to 1972.

Taoyuan County Magistrate
Wu became the Magistrate of Taoyuan County from 1973 to 1976. His father Wu Hong-ling had served in the same position from 1960 to 1964.

ROC Interior Ministry
Wu became the Ministry of the Interior twice in 1984-1988 and 1991-1994.

ROC citizens permitted to visit China
On 15 October 1987, Wu announced the lifting of prohibition of ROC citizens to travel to the Mainland Area. Citizens were allowed to do so for family visits.

KMT Vice Chairmanship
Wu was the first vice-chairman of the main opposition Kuomintang party after Kuomintang lost in the 2000 ROC Presidential Election to the Democratic Progressive Party.

KMT Chairmanship
After Chairman Ma Ying-jeou resigned on 13 February 2007, he became the acting chairman. Wu, however, subsequently resigned his post as acting chairman and member of the Central Standing Committee on 14 March 2007 in order to compete in the KMT chairman election scheduled for 7 April 2007. Ma announced his support for Wu for chairmanship.

Wu eventually won the party chairmanship election and became KMT Chairman on 11 April 2007. He garnered about 90% of votes cast, defeated KMT Legislator Hung Hsiu-chu. Of all eligible voters, about 53% voted.

Cross-strait relations

2005 China visit

In April 2005, Wu joined Lien Chan and other Pan-Blue officials to visit China.

2009 China visit

In May 2009, Wu left for China for an 8-day visit. He was accompanied by three KMT Vice Chairmen, Lin Fong-cheng, Wu Den-yih (who doubles as KMT Secretary-General) and John Chiang. Wang Yi, Director of Taiwan Affairs Office welcomed the delegations upon arrival in Beijing.

Prior to departure, Wu said that we would not mention the "Republic of China" if the Beijing government did not mention the "People's Republic of China" as well. If Beijing was to refrain from mentioning the One China principle, then he also would not talk about the 1992 consensus.

The delegations visited several cities. In Beijing, they visited the Guangdong-Guangxi House, where Sun Yat-sen was elected as Chairman of Kuomintang in 1912. In Hangzhou, they visited the Manao Temple, where a museum of Lian Heng is located. In Nanjing, they visited Sun Yat-sen Mausoleum. And in Chongqing, they attended the Taiwan Week celebration organized by Taiwanese businessmen doing business in China.

2012 Beijing visit
Wu led a delegation from Taiwan to visit Beijing in March 2012 to meet Hu Jintao, the then-General Secretary of the Chinese Communist Party (CCP); Wu proposed that cross-strait relations be governed under the framework of "one country, two areas" (一國兩區), in which from the Republic of China's point of view, ROC consists of Taiwan area and the mainland area.

Among the delegates are three of Kuomintang vice chairpersons, who are Lin Fong-cheng, John Chiang and Hung Hsiu-chu.

Taiwanese branch of Bank of China

On 27 June 2012, Wu attended the opening ceremony of the first Taiwanese branch of the Bank of China. The ceremony was held in Taipei and Wu was accompanied by Straits Exchange Foundation Chairman Chiang Pin-kung, Bank of China President Li Lihui and the bank's Taiwan branch General Manager Tsai Rong-jun.

2013 Beijing visit
Wu visited Beijing on 12–14 June 2013 to meet with Xi Jinping, General Secretary of the Communist Party for the first time since Xi took office, accompanied by high ranking KMT officials, such as Chan Chun-po, Hung Hsiu-chu, Huang Min-hui and Su Chi. Accompanying Xi Jinping were Wang Huning, Li Zhanshu, Yang Jiechi and Zhang Zhijun from the CPC.

2013 Yunnan CCP secretary visit
During a meeting between Wu and visiting Yunnan CCP committee secretary, Qin Guangrong, to Taiwan in mid September 2013, Wu said that Taiwan and Mainland China should put aside political questions and disagreements to facilitate bilateral exchanges. He said that by showing patience, setting aside differences and focusing on economic cooperation and cultural exchanges, more common areas such as lifestyle and values would emerge.

During the meeting, Qin encouraged Taiwanese businessmen to invest in Yunnan and make use of the province as the gateway to Southeast Asia and South Asia, creating business opportunities. He added that Yunnan welcomes Taiwanese farmers, township wardens, teachers, students, media and religious and business representatives. Qin's delegation, which consisted of more than 200 people, participated in several activities while in Taiwan, such as promoting bilateral exchanges in education, culture, technology, tourism and civil aviation.

2013 Nanjing visit
In October 2013, Wu traveled to Nanjing, Jiangsu to give a speech at the Xianlin Campus of Nanjing University.

Personal life
Outside of Taiwanese politics, Wu is a prominent and practicing Buddhist and plays an active role in the Fo Guang Shan Buddhist Order. Before he ascended to the KMT chairmanship, Wu served as the second worldwide president of the Buddha's Light International Association.

See also

Kuomintang
Politics of the Republic of China
History of the Republic of China
Elections in the Republic of China

References

External links
 Kuomintang Official Website

|-

1939 births
Taiwanese politicians of Hakka descent
People from Yongding District, Longyan
Affiliated Senior High School of National Taiwan Normal University alumni
Taiwanese Buddhists
Mayors of Taipei
Living people
Kuomintang politicians in Taiwan
National Cheng Kung University alumni
Magistrates of Taoyuan County
Chairpersons of the Kuomintang
Recipients of the Order of Brilliant Star
Taiwanese Ministers of the Interior